Malcolm Cherry (17 May 1878 in Liverpool – 13 April 1925 in London), was an English actor.

Selected filmography
 Far from the Madding Crowd (1915)
 A Welsh Singer (1916)
 A Place in the Sun (1916)
 Grim Justice (1916)
 A Member of Tattersall's (1919)
 Linked by Fate (1919)
 The Call of Youth (1921)

References

External links

1878 births
1925 deaths
English male film actors
English male silent film actors
Male actors from Liverpool
20th-century English male actors